Tylopilus cyanogranulifer is a bolete fungus found in Queensland, Australia, where it grows in Eucalyptus rain forest.

References

External links

cyanogranulifer
Fungi described in 1999
Fungi of Australia
Taxa named by Roy Watling